WSEW (88.7 FM) is a non-commercial educational radio station licensed to serve Sanford, Maine, United States. The station transmits from near Rochester, New Hampshire. The station is owned by Word Radio Educational Foundation.

WSEW broadcasts a Christian radio format.

History
This station received its original construction permit from the Federal Communications Commission on August 26, 1991. The new station was assigned the WSEW call sign by the FCC on October 4, 1991. WSEW received its license to cover from the FCC on August 20, 1992. In January 2010 the station was approved and began broadcasting on 88.7 .

Translators
In addition to the main station, WSEW programming is carried on WMEK 88.1 in Kennebunkport, Maine.

References

External links

SEW
Radio stations established in 1992
York County, Maine
Moody Radio affiliate stations
Sanford, Maine
1992 establishments in Maine